Passakorn Suwannawat (born 1 May 1986, Nakhon Pathom, Thailand) is a former Thai professional snooker player.

Career

Early career
Suwannawat first turned professional in the 2006–07 season by winning the 2006 ACBS Asian Under-21 Snooker Championship. He dropped off the main tour after just one season.

Suwannawat reached the final of the 2007 IBSF World Snooker Championship, losing to compatriot Atthasit Mahitthi.

2011/2012
He returned to the main tour in the 2011–12 season after winning the 2011 ACBS Asian Snooker Championship. Due to being a new player on the tour and therefore unranked he would need to win four qualifying matches to reach the ranking event main draws. He came closest to doing this in the Shanghai Masters where he defeated Adam Duffy, Jimmy Robertson and six-time world champion Steve Davis, before losing in the final round 1–5 to Stephen Lee.

Suwannawat played in 11 of the 12 PTC events throughout the season, with his best finish coming in Event 4 where he beat former world champions Mark Williams and Ken Doherty to reach the quarter-finals before losing to Neil Robertson. This performance largely contributed to him being placed 54 on the PTC Order of Merit, outside of the top 24 who qualified for the Finals. However, his results were good enough to earn him a place on the main tour for the 2012–13 season. Suwannawat finished the season ranked number 74 in the world.

2012/2013
Suwannawat began the season in the Wuxi Classic Qualifiers. He defeated Michael Wasley and Ben Woollaston, but then lost to Joe Perry in the final qualifying round. After this Suwannawat lost 17 matches in a row and had to wait until February in qualifying for the Welsh Open where he beat Jamie Jones 4–1, before losing to Marco Fu by the same scoreline. Suwannawat's season ended when he was beaten 6–10 by Zhang Anda in the first round of World Championship Qualifying. He dropped 18 places during the campaign to finish it ranked world number 92.

2013/2014
Suwannawat did not enter qualifying for the first two ranking events of the season and after he lost 5–4 in the Shanghai Masters qualifiers to Mohamed Khairy, it was announced by World Snooker that the match was being investigated due to unusual betting patterns. In January 2014, World Snooker stated that its investigation had been completed and the player had no case to answer.
Suwannawat only participated in three more events after this, losing his first round match in all of them to be relegated from the tour.

Performance and rankings timeline

Career finals

Amateur finals: 3 (2 titles)

References

External links 
 
 Pro Snooker Blog profile

Passakorn Suwannawat
Living people
1986 births
Passakorn Suwannawat
Passakorn Suwannawat